Gokarneshwor is a municipality in Kathmandu District in the Bagmati Province of Nepal that was established on 2 December 2014 by merging the former Village development committees Sundarijal, Nayapati, Baluwa, Jorpati and Gokarna. The office of the municipality is that of the former Jorpati village development committee.
The river Bagmati has its origin as the name Bagh Dwar situated in the middle of the Shivapuri jungle in this municipality. 
In the village on the banks of the Bagmati River stands the Gokarna Mahadev temple, built in 1582. In late August or early September people go to this temple to bathe and make offerings in honor of their fathers, living or dead, on a day called Gokarna Aunsi.

The Gokarna Forest Reserve is located in the area. Nepal Medical College and Teaching Hospital is located Southwest of Gokarneshwor.

Schools
Some of the well renowned schools in the municipality are East-Pole Higher Secondary School, Shangri-la Public School, Saraswati Secondary School, Manakamana Secondary School, Bouddha International School, Venus Public School, Nava Arunima School, Eyelens English School HIMS school and Timeline School. The municipality has large number of educational institutions in the nation, trailing just behind Kathmandu Mahanagarpalika.

Population
municipality has a total population of 107,351 according to 2011 Nepal census. At the time of the 2011 Nepal census the village had a population of 7,508 with 1,768 households.

Settlements
Jorpati, Nayabasti, Bensigaun, Attarkhel, Narayantar, Dakshindhoka, Jagdol, Gokarna, Sundarijal, Nayapati are the settlement areas of local people within that area.

Notable residents 
Writer Ramesh Bikal was born near Gokarna in 1932.

Gallery

References

External links

Populated places in Kathmandu District
Nepal municipalities established in 2014